Flabellisphinctes is small, evolute ammonite genus from the upper Middle Jurassic (Callovian) that lived between 160 and 154 Ma ago.

Flabellisphinctes is included in the subfamily Grossouviinae which is part of the Perisphinctidae. The shell is around 5 cm (abt. 2in) in diameter, with close spaced radial ribs on the inner whorls. Outer whorls with ribs widely spaced, coming off the umbilical shoulder and flattening about mid flank, but dividing near the ventrolateral shoulder into well defined ribs that cross the venter with a kink mid way. Whorl section, suboval compressed with a narrowly arched rim.

References 

Jurassic ammonites
Ammonitida genera
Fossils of France
Callovian life